Marit Kaldhol (born 13 April 1955) is a Norwegian poet and children's writer.

She was born in Ålesund. Her poetry collections include her 1983 debut Lattermilde laken ('Mirthful Bed Sheets') and 2005's Den einaste kjolen ('The Only Dress'). Her children's books include the internationally acclaimed Farvel, Rune ('Goodbye, Rune', 1986). Translated into German as Abschied von Rune, it earned her the Deutscher Jugendliteraturpreis in 1988.

References

1955 births
Living people
20th-century Norwegian poets
Norwegian children's writers
People from Ålesund
Norwegian women poets
Norwegian women children's writers
21st-century Norwegian poets
20th-century Norwegian women writers
21st-century Norwegian women writers